Ariana is a Bulgarian beer brand, produced by the Zagorka Brewery since 2004. The company was established in 1884, and for most of its history brewed at the Ariana Brewery in central Sofia. It was bought by Heineken in 1997 and currently has four brands – Ariana Light (5% ABV), Ariana Dark (5.5% ABV) and two citrus-flavoured brands available only in summer – Ariana Radler lemon and grapefruit (1.8% ABV).

References

External links 
 Official website
 Ariana at Bulgarian Beer

Beer in Bulgaria
1884 introductions
Bulgarian brands